Black Press Group Ltd. is a Canadian publisher of prominent daily newspapers in Hawaii and Alaska and numerous non-daily newspapers in Alberta and British Columbia, Canada, and (via Sound Publishing) the U.S. state of Washington.

Black Press Media is headquartered in Surrey, British Columbia, and has regional offices in Victoria, Williams Lake, and Kelowna.

The company was founded and is majority owned by David Holmes Black, who has no relation to Canadian-born media mogul Conrad Black. The company is 20% owned by Torstar, publisher of the Toronto Star, and David Black's former employer.

History 
After working as a junior business analyst for the Toronto Star, Black purchased the Williams Lake Tribune of Williams Lake, British Columbia, from his father, Alan, in 1975. He bought a family-run newspaper in nearby Ashcroft in 1979, and his holdings expanded "exponentially" in the ensuing years.

Though Black Press has focused its acquisitions mainly on building a province-wide network of community newspapers in British Columbia, and a similar operation (called Sound Publishing) across the border in Washington, the company has also invested in individual marquee daily products. In 2001, Black purchased the Honolulu Star-Bulletin of Hawaii (later merged with the competing Honolulu Advertiser, which Black bought in 2010). In 2006, the company acquired the Akron Beacon Journal, the former Knight Ridder flagship in Northeast Ohio.

On September 19., 2002, Torstar Corporation announced that it was investing $20 million to acquire a 19.35% share in Black Press. At that time Black Press published 88 newspapers and had 11 printing plants. Annual revues were $240 million.

On June 27, 2007, Black Press announced a $405 million takeover offer for Osprey Media, putting it in competition with Quebecor Media for Osprey's assets. Quebecor put in a higher bid and won ownership of Osprey.  it owned about 150 newspapers.

In 2011, David Black was one of several newspaper industry veterans who joined together as investors in the San Francisco Newspaper Company to buy the former Hearst flagship The San Francisco Examiner, now a free daily newspaper. Although the transaction had been reported as a purchase for Black Press, David Black participated as a private investor and holds his shares in the Examiner separately from Black Press.

In 2013 Black Press and Glacier Media Inc. exchanged four community newspapers in British Columbia. That led to the closure of Abbotsford Times. In 2014, Black Press negotiated deals with Glacier Media Inc. to take effect in March 2015 that would exchange a dozen British Columbia newspapers that consolidated ownership of competing community papers on Vancouver Island and the Lower Mainland. Black Press obtained Harbor City Star, Nanaimo Daily News, Cowichan Citizen, Parksville Oceanside Star, Tofino/Ucluelet Westerly News, Comox Valley Echo, Campbell River Courier, Surrey Now and Langley Advance.

In 2018, Black Press sold the Akron Beacon Journal to Gatehouse Media and acquired the Juneau Empire and two other papers in Alaska from Gatehouse.

In March 2021, Black Press purchased Northern News Services Limited of Yellowknife, Northwest Territories, which publishes five newspapers in the Northwest Territories and two in Nunavut.

Daily newspapers 

Black Press owns two major metropolitan daily newspapers in the United States, and several dailies as part of its community newspaper chains in the Canadian and U.S. Pacific Northwest.

Major dailies
 Honolulu Star-Advertiser (Honolulu, Hawaii)
 The Herald (Everett, Washington)

Community dailies
 Cranbrook Daily Townsman of Cranbrook, British Columbia: part of BC Interior Division
 Kimberley Daily Bulletin of Kimberley, British Columbia: part of BC Interior Division
 Peninsula Daily News of Port Angeles, Washington: part of Sound Publishing
 Red Deer Advocate of Red Deer, Alberta: flagship of the Prairie Division
 Trail Daily Times of Trail, British Columbia: part of BC Interior Division
 The Garden Island of Lihue, Hawaii: part O'ahu Publications Incorporated
 Maple Ridge-Pitt Meadows News, British Columbia

Defunct dailies
 Honolulu Advertiser: purchased February 2010, merged four months later into Star-Advertiser
 Honolulu Star-Bulletin: purchased 2001, merged with Advertiser in 2010
 King County Journal of Kent, Washington: purchased November 2006, closed two months later
 Nelson Daily News of Nelson, British Columbia: purchased July 2010, closed two weeks later
 Prince Rupert Daily News of Prince Rupert, British Columbia: purchased July 2010, closed two weeks later

Community newspapers 
Black Press is the largest publisher of newspapers in British Columbia and in Washington state. It also owns several weeklies associated with its daily properties in Alberta and Hawaii.

Alberta 
Black Press owns the daily Red Deer Advocate and several neighboring weekly newspapers in Central Alberta, in addition to various local tourism and lifestyle publications. Newspapers in Black's Prairie Division are:

 Bashaw Star
 Castor Advance
 Eckville Echo

 Ponoka News
 Red Deer Advocate
 Red Deer Express

 Rimbey Review
 Stettler Independent
 Sylvan Lake News

British Columbia 
Black's original acquisitions form the core of the 320,552-circulation BC Interior Division, whose holdings extend 1,360 km from Trail near the Washington border to Smithers near the southern tip of Alaska. The wine country publications Grapes to Wine and Wine Trails are also part of this group. Following is a list of the group's community newspapers, most of which are biweekly, weekly, semiweekly or thrice-weekly, although the group also includes three small daily newspapers in Trail, Cranbrook and Kimberley:

 100 Mile House Free Press
 Arrow Lakes News
 Ashcroft-Cache Creek Journal
 Barriere Star Journal
 Boundary Creek Times
 Burns Lake Lakes District News
 Caledonia Courier
 Cariboo Advisor
 Castlegar News
 Clearwater Times
 Coast Mountain News
 Cranbrook Daily Townsman
 Creston Valley Advance
 Eagle Valley News
 The Free Press
 Golden Star

 Grand Forks Gazette
 Houston Today
 Invermere Valley Echo
 Kamloops This Week
 Kelowna Capital News
 Keremeos Review
 Kimberley Daily Bulletin
 Kitimat Northern Sentinel
 Kootenay News Advertiser
 Lake Country Calendar
 Lakeshore News
 Merritt Herald
 Nelson Star
 The North Delta Reporter
 The Northern View
 Penticton Western News

 Prince George Free Press
 Quesnel Cariboo Observer
 Revelstoke Times Review
 Rossland News
 Salmon Arm Observer
 Similkameen Spotlight
 Smithers Interior News
 Summerland Review
 Terrace Standard
 Trail Daily Times
 The Valley
 Vanderhoof Omineca Express
 Vernon Morning Star
 West Kootenay Advertiser
 Williams Lake Tribune

Publications in Black's BC Lower Mainland Division circulate a total of 568,200 copies per week in the Vancouver area. This group includes the Chilliwack Progress, founded in 1891, which claims to be the oldest Canadian community newspaper continuously published under the same name. The group includes the lifestyle and real estate publications Indulge Magazine, New Home Living, New Local Home, North Shore Real Estate, and the following community newspapers:

 Abbotsford News
 Agassiz Harrison Observer
 Aldergrove Star
 Bowen Island Undercurrent
 Chilliwack Progress
 Chilliwack Times
 Cloverdale Reporter

 Hope Standard
 Langley Times
 Langley Advance
 Maple Ridge Times
 Maple Ridge-Pitt Meadows News
 Mission City Record
 North Shore Outlook

 Outlook North Vancouver
 Outlook West Vancouver
 Peace Arch News
 Richmond Review
 Surrey Now News-Leader

The BC Vancouver Island Division includes the entertainment weekly Where Magazine and Real Estate Victoria, both covering Victoria, British Columbia and vicinity, and the following community newspapers (including the daily Alberni Valley Times, the Cowichan News Leader Pictorial, and the Nanaimo Daily News, the first two of which were closed in 2015 followed by closure of the Nanaimo Daily News in 2016):

 Alberni Valley News
 Alberni Valley Times
 Campbell River Mirror
 Comox Valley Record
 Cowichan News Leader Pictorial
 Cowichan Valley Citizen
 Goldstream News Gazette
 Gulf Islands Driftwood

 Ladysmith Chronicle
 Lake Cowichan Gazette
 Monday Magazine
 Nanaimo Daily News
 Nanaimo News Bulletin
 North Island Gazette

 Oak Bay News
 Parksville Qualicum Beach News
 Peninsula News Review
 Saanich News
 Sooke News Mirror
 Tofino-Ucluelet Westerly News
 Victoria News

Hawaii and California
In addition to the Honolulu Star-Advertiser, the largest daily newspaper in Hawaii, Black Press' subsidiary Oahu Publications Inc. also community newspapers, the entertainment weekly Midweek, HI Luxury magazine, and prints military newspapers for U.S. bases in Hawaii. Oahu Publications Inc. took full ownership of the San Francisco Media Company in 2014.

The Garden Island
Hawaii Army Weekly
Hawaii Marine
Hawaii Tribune-Herald
Ho‘okele – Pearl Harbor-Hickam News
Honolulu Star-Advertiser
Midweek
The San Francisco Examiner
SF Weekly
West Hawaii Today

Washington and Alaska

Sound Publishing Inc., a subsidiary of Black Press, is based in Everett, Washington and is the largest community news publisher by circulation in the state of Washington. The company's holdings include four daily newspapers, The Herald, the Peninsula Daily News, The Daily World and the Tacoma Daily Index government listings publication. All of Sound Publishing's products are printed at a central press plant in Everett, Washington. Sound Publishing acquired three newspapers in Alaska in 2018. Community newspapers owned by Sound Publishing are:

King County and Pierce County
 Auburn Reporter
 Bellevue Reporter
 Bothell/Kenmore Reporter
 Enumclaw Courier-Herald
 Covington, Maple Valley & Black Diamond Reporter
 Eastside Scene Magazine
 Federal Way Mirror
 Issaquah-Sammamish Reporter
 Kent Reporter
 Kirkland Reporter
 Mercer Island Reporter
 Redmond Reporter
 Renton Reporter
 Seattle Weekly
 Snoqualmie Valley Record
 Tukwila Reporter
 Tacoma Daily Index
 Vashon-Maury Island Beachcomber

Grays Harbor County
 The (Aberdeen) Daily World
 North Coast News
 South Beach Bulletin

Okanogan County
 Okanogan Valley Gazette-Tribune

Olympic and Kitsap Peninsulas
 Bainbridge Island Review
 Central Kitsap Reporter
 Kingston Community News
 Kitsap Weekly
 North Kitsap Herald
 Port Orchard Independent
 Forks Forum
 Peninsula Daily News
 Sequim Gazette

San Juan Islands
 Islands' Sounder
 Islands' Weekly
 Journal of the San Juan Islands

Snohomish County
 The Arlington Times
 [[The Herald (Everett)|The (Everett) Herald]]
 Marysville Globe

Whidbey Island
 South Whidbey Record
 Whidbey Crosswind
 Whidbey Examiner
 Whidbey News-Times

Alaska
 Capital City Weekly
 Homer News
 Juneau Empire
 Peninsula Clarion

Online classifieds

Used.ca 

In 2007 the Black Press purchased Used.ca a Canadian online classified website with popular sites in Victoria, British Columbia, Prince Edward Island, and Ottawa, Ontario.

Controversies

Nisga'a Treaty editorials 
In 1998, company owner David Black instructed his British Columbia papers to publish a series of editorials opposing the Nisga'a Treaty, which was the first modern treaty in B.C. history, and not to publish editorials in favor of the treaty.

In January 1999, the NDP government filed a complaint to the B.C. Press Council against Black Press, arguing that its policy breached its duty to act in the public interest and violated the council's constitution. Black Press said that news coverage was not affected and editors were free to publish their opinions on their letters page.

The Press Council sided with Black Press based on finding that its newspapers "did in fact carry a diversity of opinion on the Nisga'a Treaty, including those of Premier Glen Clark, Liberal Leader Gordon Campbell, Reform Party President Bill Vander Zalm as well as those of ordinary British Columbians".

Advertiser concerns 
In August 2007, a story in the Victoria News sparked a complaint from an advertiser and led to the firing/resignation of three senior Black Press employees.
Victoria News reporter Brennan Clarke quit the publication after a story he wrote about buying cheaper cars in the United States led to a complaint from Victoria car dealership Dave Wheaton Pontiac Buick GMC. Black Press claimed the article was not balanced, and said that reporters and editors should not purposely jeopardize advertising revenue with their stories, because that revenue pays their salaries. The company also fired the Victoria News long-time editor, Keith Norbury, in part because of the complaint, and Black Press's Vancouver Island Newsgroup regional editor, Brian Lepine, resigned in protest.

The Canadian Association of Journalists publicly questioned the credibility and independence of the Victoria News, wondering how many stories Black Press kills behind the scenes because of advertising concerns.

See also
List of newspapers in Canada

References

External links 
 
 Sound Publishing - Black Press subsidiary in Washington state

 
Newspaper companies of Canada
Companies based in Surrey, British Columbia
Publishing companies established in 1975
1975 establishments in British Columbia
Canadian companies established in 1975